Manchester Wythenshawe was a parliamentary constituency centred on the Wythenshawe suburb of Manchester.  It returned one Member of Parliament (MP)  to the House of Commons of the Parliament of the United Kingdom.

The constituency was created for the 1950 general election, and abolished for the 1997 general election. It was then replaced by the new Wythenshawe and Sale East constituency which joined it with the eastern half of Sale from the Trafford Metropolitan Borough.

Boundaries

1950–1955: The County Borough of Manchester wards of Didsbury and Wythenshawe.

1955–1974: The County Borough of Manchester wards of Baguley, Benchill, Didsbury, Northenden, and Woodhouse Park.

1974–1983: The County Borough of Manchester wards of Baguley, Benchill, Northenden, and Woodhouse Park.

1983–1997:  The City of Manchester wards of Baguley, Benchill, Brooklands, Northenden, Sharston, and Woodhouse Park.

Members of Parliament

Elections

Elections in the 1950s

Elections in the 1960s

Elections in the 1970s

Elections in the 1980s

Elections in the 1990s

References

Wythenshawe
Wythenshawe
Constituencies of the Parliament of the United Kingdom established in 1950
Constituencies of the Parliament of the United Kingdom disestablished in 1997